Next Level Chef is an American culinary reality competition television series that premiered on Fox on January 2, 2022. The series is hosted by Gordon Ramsay, who also serves as a mentor along with Nyesha Arrington and Richard Blais.

In March 2022, the series was renewed for a second season, which premiered in February 2023 as the Super Bowl LVII lead-out program.

Format
Chefs compete in a series of cooking challenges, divided into three teams under the guidance and judgment of Ramsay, Arrington, and Blais. In each episode, chefs are assigned to cook in one of three kitchens stacked on top of each other. The top level is equipped with a wide range of modern tools and devices, the middle level is a standard commercial kitchen, and the bottom level contains a limited collection of lower-quality equipment.

In the first season, the chefs are divided into three groups, and each group is randomly assigned a mentor and kitchen. Based on their evaluation of the chefs' dishes, the mentors take turns choosing one chef at a time for their respective teams. The teams are randomly assigned to the kitchens in subsequent episodes. In the second season, the mentors pick their chefs prior to the first challenge, and kitchen assignments for the teams are based on the results from the challenges throughout the episodes.

Before each challenge, a platform stocked with ingredients is lowered through the structure from top to bottom. As it reaches each level, the chefs cooking there have 30 seconds to collect whatever items they think they will need, including no more than one protein each. They are then given 45 minutes to prepare, cook, and plate their dishes, incorporating any surprise ingredient(s) that may be delivered to them on the platform without warning during that time.

During the team competition episodes, the chef whose dish is judged the best overall wins immunity from elimination for his/her entire team. The mentors of the other two teams each choose one of their own members for a 30-minute head-to-head challenge on the top level. The ingredient platform remains available throughout this time, and the mentor of the winning team supervises the two chefs' cooking while their teammates observe and offer advice. Based on their opinions of the dishes, the other two mentors select one chef to be eliminated from the competition; if they disagree, the winning team's mentor casts the tiebreaking vote.

Changes introduced in later episodes include:

 Denial of immunity to any team at the end of a challenge.
 Elimination challenges involving three or more chefs, in which only the one with the best dish is safe.
 Disbandment of the teams, forcing the chefs to compete directly against one another.
 Reduction in cooking time from 45 minutes to 40 in the main challenge.
 Kitchen assignments for each episode based on the chefs' performance in the previous one(s); all chefs assigned to the bottom level after a main challenge must compete to avoid elimination.
 A total of 90 minutes to cook three dishes in the finale, one per level.

The winner will receive $250,000 and a one-year mentorship under all three mentors.

Production
On May 17, 2021, it was announced that Fox had ordered the series, with Gordon Ramsay as a mentor, who also serves as an executive producer. Nyesha Arrington and Richard Blais also serve as mentors for the series, the latter replacing Gino D'Acampo. On October 19, 2021, it was announced that the series would premiere on January 2, 2022.

On March 2, 2022, it was announced that Fox renewed the series for a second season, prior to the airing of the first season's finale on the same day. On May 16, 2022, it was announced that the second season would premiere on February 12, 2023 as the Super Bowl LVII lead-out program.

The show is filmed on a set constructed in Las Vegas. The set, built within an industrial tent, consists of three kitchens that are stacked on top of each other. Many aspects of the set, including the burners, ranges, and generators, are all run on gas.

Episodes

Series overview

Season 1 (2022)

Season 2 (2023)

International versions
A British version of the show was commissioned by ITV in June 2022. It later premiered on January 11, 2023. Gordon Ramsay and Nyesha Arrington from the American version serve as mentors, along with Paul Ainsworth.

A French version of the show was commissioned by Kitchen Factory Productions in October 2022.

References

External links
 
 

 
2020s American cooking television series
2020s American reality television series
2022 American television series debuts
Cooking competitions in the United States
English-language television shows
Food reality television series
Television shows shot in the Las Vegas Valley
Fox Broadcasting Company original programming
Television series by Fox Entertainment
Super Bowl lead-out shows